The Three Godfathers is a 1916 American silent film featuring Harry Carey. The film was remade in 1919 as Marked Men, which also starred Carey. John Ford's 1948 remake of Three Godfathers was dedicated to Harry Carey Sr., the star of the first adaptation.

Plot summary

Cast

 Stella LeSaint as Ruby Merrill, "The Mojave Lily" (as Stella Razeto)
 Harry Carey as Bob Sangster
 George Berrell as Tim Gibbons
 Joe Rickson as Rusty Conners
 Jack Hoxie as Sheriff Pete Cushing (as Hart Hoxie)
 Frank Lanning as Bill Kearny
 J.F. Briscoe as Johnny Pell (as Mr. Briscoe)

See also
 Harry Carey filmography

References

External links

 
 
 
 

1916 Western (genre) films
1916 films
American black-and-white films
Films based on American novels
Films based on Western (genre) novels
Films directed by Edward LeSaint
Silent American Western (genre) films
Universal Pictures films
1910s American films
1910s English-language films